Tupuzabad may refer to:
 Tupuzabad, Naqadeh
 Tupuzabad, Urmia
 Tupuzabad, Silvaneh, Urmia County